The 2015 Cincinnati Bearcats football team represented the University of Cincinnati in the 2015 NCAA Division I FBS football season.  The team returned on campus to Nippert Stadium after playing 2014 home games at Paul Brown Stadium during stadium renovation. The Bearcats were led by third-year head coach Tommy Tuberville and were members of the Eastern Division of the American Athletic Conference. They finished the season 7–6 overall and 4–4 in American Athletic lay to finish in a tie for third place in the East Division. They were invited to the Hawaii Bowl where they lost to San Diego State.

Schedule

Schedule Source:

Game summaries

Alabama A&M

The clash with Alabama A&M was the first game played in newly renovated Nippert Stadium.  The announced attendance of 39,095 broke a two-year-old Nippert attendance record, despite a weak opponent and a one-hour-and-forty-five minute weather delay. UC buried Alabama A&M as expected, in a game matching a major college FBS (Football Bowl Subdivision) team against a weaker FCS (Football Championship Subdivision) team. UC went 9–4 last year, while Alabama A&M was 4–8. UC junior quarterback Gunner Kiel was 18-for-22 passing for 233 yards and two touchdowns for UC, all in the first half. Redshirt freshman Hayden Moore made his college debut in replacing Kiel at quarterback late in the first half. Moore went 8-for-14 passing for 107 yards and a touchdown. Senior wide receiver Shaq Washington had seven catches for 69 yards. Senior wide receiver Johnny Holton had three catches for 81 yards and two TDs. Senior wide receiver Alex Chisum had four catches for 55 yards and a touchdown. UC junior running back Tion Green had 17 carries for 127 yards and a touchdown. Senior running back Hosey Williams, the starter, had 18 carries for 95 yards and a touchdown. Sophomore running back Mike Boone had 13 carries for 86 yards and two TDs. UC had 636 total yards (340 passing, 296 rushing). Alabama A&M had 246 total yards, only 98 rushing. UC officials had previously expected a sellout crowd, which failed to materialize most likely because of the inclement conditions and late start time.

Temple

The preseason AAC-favorite Bearcats lost despite outgaining the Owls 557–296 on offense and earning a staggering 21 more first downs (34–13).  Quarterback Gunner Kiel threw four interceptions and senior running back Hosey Williams lost a fumble to create a 5–1 turnover deficit for Cincinnati which, when added to a successful surprise onside kick by Temple, played a massive role in deciding the game for the Owls.  Despite going down 34–12 early in the fourth quarter, the Bearcats nevertheless clawed their way back, driving in two touchdowns to close the gap to one score.  After recovering a nearly-disastrous fumble from Temple running back Jahad Thomas, who had 193 yards and a rushing score on 23 carries in addition to a kickoff return for a touchdown, UC drove the ball to the Temple five yard-line with just under twenty seconds to play and a timeout remaining.  However, Kiel's pass in the end zone to wide receiver Chris Moore bounced out of Moore's hands and into the diving grasp of Temple linebacker Tyler Matakevich.  It was Matakevich's second interception on a tipped pass, and it decimated any hopes of a Bearcat comeback.

Miami (OH)

Style points aside, favored UC rallied for a 37–33 win over rival Miami University before 18,484 fans on a sunny Saturday at Yager Stadium.
Backup quarterback Hayden Moore, a redshirt freshman playing in relief of injured Gunner Kiel, scored on a 1-yard plunge to give UC the go-ahead points with 1:13 left. Bearcats linebacker Eric Wilson, who had a game-high 18 tackles, broke up a Miami fourth-down pass at the RedHawks’ 29-yard line to seal things with 48 seconds left. The Bearcats retained the Victory Bell for the 10th straight year in its series with Miami. The Bearcats were 20-point favorites but again struggled to beat the RedHawks, who have played UC close for the past three years. The game was close throughout. UC led 14–7 after one quarter and 24–23 at halftime. It was 30–30 after three quarters. UC lost Kiel to a head injury on a roughing-the-passer call with 12:52 left in the third quarter, after he went 15-for-26 passing for 145 yards and a touchdown. Moore stepped in and helped keep UC alive, completing 7–14 passes for 118 yards and also rushing for 29 yards and a touchdown. But he also committed four turnovers in the fourth quarter alone, via two interceptions and two lost fumbles.

Memphis

Redshirt freshman Hayden Moore broke a seemingly unbreakable University of Cincinnati passing record here Thursday night in a crazy, borderline ridiculous football game. It was also a UC loss, in a 53–46 shootout against Memphis at Liberty Bowl Memorial Stadium. A crowd of 45,172 gasped for air and a national TV audience watched in amazement. Moore threw for 557 yards to break the 47-year-old UC single-game passing mark held by Bearcats great Greg Cook (554). Moore did it in a little over three-plus quarters, after starter Gunner Kiel departed with a neck injury with 3:25 left in the first period. Moore completed 31-of-53 passes for 557 yards, with four touchdowns and two interceptions. Cook’s record was 554 yards against Ohio University in 1968. UC had 752 total yards overall, breaking the school mark of 711 set against UConn in 2009. UC also set a school mark with 38 first downs, and the 752 yards were the most Memphis has ever allowed. The Bearcats fell to 2–2 overall and 0–2 in the American Athletic Conference East, after being the preseason media pick to win both the East and overall league title. Memphis, the preseason AAC West favorite, improved to 4–0 overall and 1–0 in the West.

Miami (FL)

With several of their best players watching in street clothes, the Cincinnati Bearcats pulled a signature football upset that saw UC students gleefully storm the field late Thursday night. UC surprised the Miami Hurricanes 34–23 before a Nippert Stadium record crowd of 40,101, for the most prestigious victory of the three-year Tommy Tuberville coaching era. A national TV audience also watched on ESPN, with the Bearcats 7-point underdogs to one of America's glamour college programs. The odds were stacked against UC, with regular quarterback Gunner Kiel among several key Bearcats who did not dress. Kiel watched from the press box. Running back Mike Boone, wide receivers Johnny Holton and Chris Moore and safety Andre Jones were among other injured Bearcats who did not dress. The Bearcats (3–2) led most of the way in beating the Hurricanes (3–1), who had not lost to UC since their first meeting in 1947. UC since had lost 11 straight games to Miami, and most were whippings on the scale of last year's 55–34 Hurricanes win in Miami. UC is now 2–5 under Tuberville against Power Five teams. That does not include two games in 2013 against Rutgers (win) and Louisville (loss), which then were in the AAC with UC.

BYU

With the scenic Wasatch Mountain Range towering majestically above the stadium, the Cincinnati Bearcats enjoyed both the view and the football game for most of Friday night here. Then came the fourth quarter. UC came apart down the stretch and lost 38–24 to Brigham Young University after being physically manhandled and outscored 21–0 in the final period. UC redshirt freshman quarterback Hayden Moore was sacked eight times in his second career start. Former starter Gunner Kiel dressed but did not play after missing the previous game with a neck injury. The Bearcats' defense, on the other hand, failed to sack BYU freshman quarterback Tanner Mangum. The UC pass rush was consistently stymied. Mangum was 19-for-32 passing for 252 yards and two touchdowns, with one interception. Moore was 15-for-30 passing for 219 yards, with no touchdowns or interceptions. But the heavy pressure took a toll. A noisy crowd of 57,612 attended at LaVell Edwards Stadium. A national TV audience also watched on ESPN as the UC offense stalled and the Bearcats were gashed for three touchdowns in a six-minute stretch of the fourth quarter. UC (3–3) was denied a second consecutive quality win. The Bearcats had been idle after upsetting the Miami Hurricanes 34–23 in their last game on Oct. 1. BYU (5–2) was a 4-point favorite, according to Las Vegas lines. UC dominated the first quarter, building a 10–0 lead with a 205–19 edge in total yardage. The Bearcats built their lead to 17–3 before settling for a 17–10 halftime lead. UC dominated the first half statistically, with a 262–166 edge in total yards. In the second half, UC was outgained 283–75.

UConn

Gunner Kiel admittedly was upset at losing his University of Cincinnati quarterback job, but he flourished Saturday upon regaining the No. 1 role. Kiel, making his first start in a month, was 26-for-35 passing for 327 yards and two touchdowns and also rushed for a touchdown as UC crushed UConn 37–13, in the Bearcats' Homecoming game at rainy Nippert Stadium. Kiel was injured in two different games in September and Hayden Moore temporarily took the quarterback job. UC went 1–1 with redshirt freshman Moore starting, after going 2–2 with junior Kiel to start the year. With Moore battered for eight sacks in a 38–24 loss at BYU last week and suffering some tendinitis this week, Kiel regained his job with strong practice performances. UC coach Tommy Tuberville said Kiel was unhappy about watching from the sidelines last week. That was indeed the case, Kiel said. Kiel put on a show before paid crowd of 40,124, a Nippert record. The game was sold out in advance but actual attendance was less than capacity, with intermittent showers during the game. UC senior running back Hosey Williams rushed for 140 yards and a touchdown, and sophomore running back Mike Boone rushed for 117 yards. Junior running back Tion Green rushed for 71 yards, as UC totaled 285 yards rushing. Senior wide receiver Shaq Washington had eight catches for 78 yards. Washington needs eight catches to become the UC career receptions leader. Junior linebacker Eric Wilson led the defense with 11 tackles. Junior safety Zach Edwards and freshman linebacker Bryce Jenkinson also had eight tackles. "Our D-line stepped up big tonight, and everything starts with them," Edwards said. "They stopped the run and their pass rush was great. (UConn) couldn't get the ball off." The Bearcats (4–3 overall, 1–2 American Athletic Conference East) won easily despite falling behind 7–0 early. The Bearcats accumulated a 612–266 advantage in total yardage.

UCF

It was perfect football weather, crisp and overcast. Perfect for the University of Cincinnati to slaughter winless Central Florida, and for UC senior Shaq Washington to break the Bearcats' career record for receptions. Not to mention, a perfect day passing (15-for-15, 319 yards, five touchdown passes) by UC junior quarterback Gunner Kiel. UC routed the Knights 52–7 at Nippert Stadium on Saturday afternoon, as wide receiver Washington set a UC mark with his 205th career catch. Washington, from Cleveland suburb Maple Heights, broke the record on his eighth catch of the day: A 20-yard reception late in the third quarter. UC fans gave Washington a standing ovation. The Bearcats career record had been 204 catches, shared by Mardy Gilyard (UC 2005; 2007–2009), Dominick Goodman (2005–2008) and LaDaris Vann (1999–2002). "I tried not to focus on it a lot, but at the same time, a lot of people were talking about it," Washington said. Washington was determined to get the record at home, with UC playing at Houston next week. Washington also had his first career two-touchdown game. For the day, Washington had eight catches for 72 yards. "It was a unique deal for Shaq to break the record here at home," Tuberville said. "His family is there and the fans get to see it. As I just told the team, that's a unique deal to break a record like that, that's been around here for a while." The temperature was in the upper 40s at kickoff, and a Nippert season-low crowd of 30,131 was treated to a blowout. UC emptied its bench, and fans began leaving early with the game in hand. UC (5–3, 2–2 American Athletic Conference East) had 726 yards of total offense, second best in school history. UCF had 313 total yards. Kiel's 15-for-15 day marked the most completions without an incompletion by any Football Bowl Subdivision player in the last 20 years, according to ESPN Stats & Info. UC moved within one win of bowl eligibility and achieved its first two-game winning streak this season.

Houston

Tulsa

The Class of 2016 Seniors took their final bow at Nippert Stadium, winning a wild shootout with Tulsa. Gunner Kiel threw for 386 and two scores as the Bearcats scored 21 straight points to rally from a 24-21 3rd quarter deficit. The Bearcats were 13-17 on 3rd down conversions and rang up 652 yards of total offense scoring over 30 points for the 4th straight home game.

South Florida

15 seconds into the game, Bulls QB BJ Flowers hit WR Rodney Flowers on a 67 yard bomb and the rout was essentially on. The Bulls kept scoring and scoring and scoring in front of gleeful home crowd and a national audience. The Bearcats could seemingly do little to stop the Bulls onslaught. The Bulls rang up 51 points in the first half alone and trampled the Bearcats with 361 rushing yards. The Bulls scored each of the five times they got into the Red Zone. The loss prevented the Bearcats from becoming bowl-eligible.

East Carolina

The Bearcats became bowl eligible at the very last second. Andrew Gantz's 42 yard field goal at the final gun won a sloppy 19-16 decision over East Carolina in Greenville NC. The Bearcats fell behind in the 1st quarter again, this time by 10 but chipped away with 16 straight points to take a 16-10 lead, the Pirates tied the game in the 4th quarter but missed the extra point that would have given them the lead. The Bearcats Shaq Washington set a school record with 15 receptions in the game. UC eked out the win though they dominated the time of possession having the ball over 36 minutes.

San Diego State-Hawaii Bowl

Rashaad Penny took the opening kickoff and returned it 100 yards for a touchdown, and that was the beginning of a long painful rout the Aztecs handed the Bearcats. While not the dizzying blitz that South Florida handed out a month earlier it was no less painful and just as thorough. The Bearcats came into the game slight favorites though the Aztecs were riding a 9 game win streak. Donnell Pumprhey ran for a touchdown, threw for another and the Aztecs dominated both sides of the ball. The Aztecs scored 42 unanswered points, the last on an interception return for a touchdown. A late Mike Boone TD run with under 4 minutes to play averted the Bearcats first shutout in ten years but a national TV audience saw the Bearcats lose their 3rd straight bowl game under Tommy Tuberville by a 42-7 score

Roster

Awards and milestones

Players in the 2016 NFL Draft

References

Cincinnati
Cincinnati Bearcats football seasons
Cincinnati Bearcats football